Mamba is a surname. Notable people with the surname include:

Alberto Mamba (born 1994), Mozambican middle-distance runner
Manuel Mamba (born 1958), Filipino politician
Mzwandile Mamba (born 1981), Swazi politician
Ndumiso Mamba, Swazi government minister
Priscilla Mamba (born 1972), Swazi long-distance runner
Virginie Mamba (born 1980), Democratic Republic of the Congo handball player

See also
Hugo Mamba-Schlick (born 1982), Cameroonian triple jumper

Bantu-language surnames